Kathmandu District (Nepal Bhasa: ये: जिल्ला) is a district located in Kathmandu Valley, Bagmati Province of Nepal. The administrative headquarters of Kathmandu district is located in Kathmandu.

Geography
Kathmandu district is one of the three districts located in Kathmandu Valley, which itself is located in the hills of Bagmati Province. The district is located from 27°27′E to 27°49′E longitude and 85°10′N to 85°32′N latitude.

The district is surrounded by:
East: Bhaktapur District and Kavrepalanchok District
West: Dhading District and Nuwakot District
North: Nuwakot District and Sindhupalchok District
South: Lalitpur District and Makwanpur District

Geography and climate

In the urban center, the temperature fluctuates between 32 °C in summer (June–July) to -2 °C in winter (December–January). Except for the high hills including Chandragiri which has a temperate climate, Kathmandu district has a subtropical climate.  The annual rainfall of the district is 176.4 ml.

Culture
Kathmandu district is a part of Kathmandu valley, which is a melting pot of various cultural groups, ethnicities, races, languages and religions. This vibrant culture is illustrated in the culture of the natives of the district, known as Newars, who are a multiethnic, multiracial, multireligious people bound by a Sanskritized Sino-Tibetan language of Kirat origins known as Nepal Bhasa. All the ancient settlements of the district have specific street festivals (jatras) arranged according to specific dates of the Nepal Sambat calendar. The main festivals celebrated are:
Yanya Punhi – literally meaning Kathmandu's full moon, a week-long festival during the Yenla (the month of Kathmandu) of Nepal Sambat, a festival started by Gunakamadev, the founder of Kathmandu city to commemorate the establishment of city
Gunla – a month in which musical bands and ordinary people make pilgrimage to Swayambhunath temple
Mohani
Dashain – the main festival of Nepal, celebrated by visiting the various Shaktipeeths around the city
Shivaratri – a very special festival in which people make small fire all around the city and take different types of toxic in order to show love to Lord Shiva
Buddha Jayanti
Sa Paru – a comic festival to commemorate dead relatives, celebrated during the full moon of Goon la
Chatha – the birthday of Lord Ganesha of Hindu pantheon
Holi
Pahan Chare – a festival of Animist origin celebrated by procession of matriarchs of Kathmandu
Shree Panchami – in the past children used to formally start education on this day. Presently, deities of wisdom, Saraswati and Manjushree (the mythological founder of the valley) are worshipped on this day
Swanti or Tihar – a five-day festival, the third day of which is called Laxmi Puja, when the families do their annual financial calculation and the next day marks the New Year according to Nepalese calendar, Nepal Sambat.

Along with these festivals, with the influx of population from other parts of Nepal, India, Tibet and South Asia, other festivals such as Teej, Chhath, Sakela, Lhosar, Janai Purnima, Deuda etc. are also celebrated.

Economy
Most of the offices and industries of Nepal are in Kathmandu. The major economic hubs are New Road, Durbar Marg, Putalisadak, Asan. The district exports handicrafts, artworks, garments, pashmina, paper etc. Tourism is one of the main industries of the district. Hindu and Buddhist pilgrims from all over the world visit various religious places located in the district such as Pashupatinath, Swayambhunath, Boudhanath, Buddhanilkantha etc. Freak Street and Thamel are noted tourist destinations for Western tourists.

Education
Kathmandu district is the pioneer district in education in many aspects in Nepal. Durbar High School (the first school of Nepal), Trichandra College (the first college of Nepal), Padma Kanya College (the first women's college) are all located in Kathmandu city. Tribhuwan University, the first university of Nepal, is located in Kirtipur municipality of Kathmandu district. Besides these, thousands of educational institutions are located in the district which enrolls students from Nepal, India, Bangladesh etc.

Administration

The district consists of 10 Municipalities and 1 Metrocity. These are as follows:

Major cities 
Cities and towns with 75,000+ population of Kathmandu district as per 2021 Nepal census.

Minor  municipalities 
Dakshinkali Municipality
Shankharapur Municipality

Demographics
At the time of the 2011 Nepal census, Kathmandu District had a population of 1,744,240, out of which 913,001 were male and 831,239 female in 436,355 households.
Average family size was 4.6 in 2001 and 4.0 in 2011 

62.6% spoke Nepali, 17.3% Newar, 8.3% Tamang, 2.1% Maithili, 1.2% Gurung, 1.2% Magar, 1.1% Bhojpuri, 1.1% Hindi, 1.1% Sherpa, 0.9% Rai, 0.6% Tharu, 0.3% Limbu, 0.3% Rajasthani, 0.3% Urdu, 0.2% Bengali, 0.1% Doteli, 0.1% Sunuwar, 0.1% Thakali, 0.1% Tibetan, 0.1% Yolmo and 0.2% other languages as their first language.

In terms of ethnicity/caste, 23.7% were Hill Brahmin, 22.3% Newar, 19.8% Chhetri, 10.9% Tamang, 4.0% Magar, 2.6% Gurung, 2.3% Rai, 1.3% Sherpa, 1.2% Musalman, 1.1% Kami, 1.1% Thakuri, 1.0% Tharu, 0.8% Marwadi, 0.7% Damai/Dholi, 0.7% Sanyasi/Dasnami, 0.6% Limbu, 0.5% other Dalit, 0.4% Teli, 0.3% Gharti/Bhujel, 0.3% Kalwar, 0.3% Kathabaniyan, 0.3% Sarki, 0.3% other Terai, 0.3% Yadav, 0.2% Bengali, 0.2% Hajam/Thakur, 0.2% Majhi, 0.2% Sunuwar, 0.2% Thakali, 0.1% Badi, 0.1% Bhote, 0.1% Terai Brahmin, 0.1% Danuwar, 0.1% Dhanuk, 0.1% foreigners, 0.1% Ghale, 0.1% Halwai, 0.1% Kanu, 0.1% Kayastha, 0.1% Koiri/Kushwaha, 0.1% Kumal, 0.1% Rajput, 0.1% Sudhi, 0.1% Yolmo and 0.1% others.

In terms of religion, 80.0% were Hindu, 15.4% Buddhist, 2.3% Christian, 1.3% Muslim, 0.8% Kirati, 0.1% Prakriti and 0.1% others.

In terms of literacy, 86.1% could read and write, 1.6% could only read and 12.4% could neither read nor write.

Hospitals
Bir Hospital
Tribhuvan University Teaching Hospital
Chhetrapati Free Hospital (Chhetrapati Nishulka Chikitsalaya)
Babukaji Memorial Hospital
Gangalal Hridaya Kendra
Manmohan Memorial Hospital
Tilganga Eye Hospital

See also

Zones of Nepal (Former)
Kathmandu Metropolitan City
Kathmandu Valley
Kathmandu
Kirtipur
Sanglekhola
Pasikot

References

External links

DDC Kathmandu
UN.org: UN map of VDC boundaries, water features and roads in Kathmandu
Rainfall in Kathmandu
 

 
Districts of Nepal established during Rana regime or before
Districts of Bagmati Province